The Canadian Team Ranking System (CTRS) is a point system used by Curling Canada to rank men's and women's curling teams across Canada. They are determined through points earned in various curling bonspiels held worldwide throughout the season.

CTRS points are the basis of the World Curling Tour's Order of Merit and are also used as criteria in identifying teams that qualify for the Canadian Olympic Curling Trials. Beginning in 2018, the top two CTRS teams that do not otherwise qualify for the Scotties Tournament of Hearts or Tim Hortons Brier will earn the right to compete in a play-in game for a wildcard berth in those tournaments.

The following lists the top 25 teams in the CTRS standings for each curling season beginning in 2003–04.

Records

2003–04

2004–05

2005–06

2006–07

2007–08

2008–09

2009–10

2010–11

2011–12

2012–13

2013–14

2014–15

2015–16

2016–17

2017–18

2018–19

2019–20

2021–22
No ranking was calculated for the 2020–21 curling season due to the COVID-19 pandemic in Canada

See also
 The Brier
 Tournament of Hearts
 World Curling Tour

References

External links
Canadian Team Ranking System (CTRS)

Curling in Canada